Jarrett Porter (born 1993) is an American baritone known for his performances as an opera and lieder singer.

Early life and education
Porter was born in Philadelphia, Pennsylvania, and raised in the Dennisville section of Dennis Township, New Jersey. He attended the Eastman School of Music, where he received a Bachelor of Music degree, and San Francisco Conservatory of Music, where he received a Master of Music degree as a James Schwabacher Fellow. Porter also received further instruction at the Marion Roose Pullin Studio at Arizona Opera, and in the apprentice programs of Santa Fe Opera, The Glimmerglass Festival, and Opera Saratoga.

Career
At Arizona Opera, Porter performed Guglielmo in Così fan tutte, Father Palmer in Silent Night, Baron Douphol in La Traviata, Maximilian in Candide, Sciarrone in Tosca, and Fiorello in The Barber of Seville. In 2018, Porter joined the Santa Fe Opera, where he sang Der Perückenmacher in Ariadne auf Naxos, and the Sergeant in  La bohème.  In the 2019-2020 season, he debuted at Tulsa Opera as Dancaïre in Carmen, and joined Renée Fleming and the Santa Fe Opera Orchestra as a soloist in Ralph Vaughan Williams's Serenade to Music. In 2020, Porter joined The Juilliard School as a candidate for an artist diploma in opera studies and sang the role of Neil Armstrong in the world premiere of Steven Mackey’s Moon Tea at the Opera Theatre of St. Louis. Porter most recently sang the role of Oliver Sacks in the world premiere of Tobias Picker's Awakenings at the Opera Theatre of St. Louis in 2022.

Awards
Porter has been a grant recipient of the 2021 Gerda Lissner Song Competition, winner of The Sullivan Foundation (2019), winner of the 2021 and 2019 District rounds of the Metropolitan Opera National Council, the Ellie Silver Award Winner at the 2018 Holt Competition, and the 2017 Grand Prize Winner of the Pacific Music Society Competition.

References

External links
Jarrett Porter's Personal Website

Living people
1993 births
American baritones
People from Dennis Township, New Jersey
Musicians from Philadelphia
Singers from New Jersey
Singers from Pennsylvania
Classical musicians from New Jersey
Classical musicians from Pennsylvania
Eastman School of Music alumni
San Francisco Conservatory of Music alumni
21st-century American male opera singers